Up, Up and Away may refer to:

Music

Albums
 Up, Up and Away (The 5th Dimension album), 1967
 Up, Up and Away (Johnny Mathis album), 1967
 Up, Up and Away (Sonny Criss album), 1967

Songs
 "Up, Up and Away" (song), written by Jimmy Webb; first recorded by the 5th Dimension, 1967
 "Up, Up and Away", by Blush from Shake It Up: Live 2 Dance
 "Up Up and Away", by Juice WRLD from Legends Never Die
 "Up Up & Away", by Kid Cudi from Man on the Moon: The End of Day

Other uses
 Up, Up and Away (film), a 2000 Disney film
 "Superman: Up, Up and Away!", a 2006 Superman comics story arc
 "Up, up and away", the home run call of baseball announcer Dave Van Horne

See also
 "Stuck Up, Up, and Away", an episode of The Powerpuff Girls
 Up, Up and Oy Vey, a 2006 book by Rabbi Simcha Weinstein